2019 Israel Super Cup was the 24th Israel Super Cup (29th, including unofficial matches, as the competition wasn't played within the Israel Football Association in its first 5 editions, until 1969), an annual football match in Israel.

History
The Super Cup is a competition between the winners of the previous season's Top Division and Israel State Cup. This is the fourth time since 1990 that the match was staged after a planned resumption of the cup was canceled in 2014.

In 2019, the game was played between Maccabi Tel Aviv, champions of the 2018–19 Israeli Premier League and Bnei Yehuda Tel Aviv, winners of the 2018–19 Israeli State Cup. Tel Aviv won 1-0.

Match details

See also
Sports in Israel

References

2019–20 in Israeli football
Super Cup 2019
Super Cup 2019
Israel Super Cup
Israel Super Cup
Israel Super Cup matches